

Terrestrial ecoregions
Paraguay is in the Neotropical realm. Ecoregions are listed by biome.

Tropical and subtropical moist broadleaf forests
 Alto Paraná Atlantic forests

Tropical and subtropical dry broadleaf forests
 Chaco (Dry Chaco)

Tropical and subtropical grasslands, savannas, and shrublands
 Cerrado
 Humid Chaco

Flooded grasslands and savannas
 Pantanal

Freshwater ecoregions
 Chaco
 Lower Parana
 Upper Parana
 Paraguay

References

 
Paraguay
ecoregions